The 7th IPC Ice Sledge Hockey World Championships took place in the SPART Complex in Goyang, South Korea from 12 to 20 April 2013. It was the first time that South Korea hosted the IPC Ice Sledge Hockey World Championships. In the final match, Canada defeated the United States 1-0, to win their third title. Russia defeated the Czech Republic 3-0 for the bronze medal.

A-Pool

Preliminary round
All times are local (UTC+9).

Group A

Group B

Classification round

Bracket

5–8th place semifinals

Seventh place game

Fifth place game

Final round

Bracket

Semifinals

Bronze medal game

Final

Final standings

Awards
Best players selected by the Directorate:
Best Goaltender:  Mikhail Ivanov
Best Defenceman:  Taylor Chace
Best Forward:  Greg Westlake

B-Pool

Preliminary round
All times are local (UTC+9).

Group A

Group B

Final round

Bracket

Semifinals

Fifth place game

Third place game

Final

Final standings

References

External links
 Results book – A-Pool
 Results book – B-Pool

World Para Ice Hockey Championships
IPC Ice Sledge Hockey World Championships
2012–13 in South Korean ice hockey
International ice hockey competitions hosted by South Korea
Sports competitions in Goyang
IPC Ice Sledge Hockey World Championships